Edmund Weaver (c. 1683 – 27 December 1748) was an English astronomer, land surveyor, and friend to William Stukeley. Weaver's The British Telescope ephemerides (astronomical tables) is considered an important 18th-century publication on the movement of planets.

Personal life
Edmund Weaver was born circa 1683 and lived at Frieston in Lincolnshire.  He died on 27 December 1748, and was buried at St Vincent's Church, Caythorpe, the village to the north of his home at Frieston. The south chancel at St Vincent's contains a memorial to him.

Astronomy
Self-taught, Weaver wrote The British Telescope, which led antiquarian William Stukeley to describe him as "a very uncommon genius, who had made himself master in astronomy and was scarcely to be accounted the second in the kingdom". It was through association with Weaver that Stukeley developed an interest in astronomy. Weaver's writing on astronomy and astrology was also appreciated by Martin Folkes, the president of the Society of Antiquaries.

Weaver supported the heliocentric view of the universe. He opposed criticism of the accuracy of ephemerides formulated by Edmond Halley, the Astronomer Royal, particularly that from Tycho Wing. Through his 1741 edition of The British Telescope, he described the path of the forthcoming 1769 transit of Venus as curved, and planetary movement as elliptical, attracting the attention of the Royal Astronomer journal.

Land survey
In 1734, Weaver printed Proposals for making and publishing for Subscription an actual Survey of the County of Lincoln. The project was started but unfinished, with only a map and measurements of certain roads and bearings between places remaining. A correspondent to The Gentleman's Magazine, after examining the project in Weaver's effects, described him as "a noted Astrologer, Almanack-maker, Quack Doctor, Land Surveyor".  The proposed survey of Lincolnshire would include all wapentakes, churches, chapels, religious houses, chaces and parks, notable houses, castles, and nobility. It would cover all parishes, settlements, waterways, bridges, and roads, would be carried out with contemporary technological equipment, and would be fully indexed.

References

Further reading
Weaver, Edmund: The British Telescope: Being an Ephemeris of the Coelestial Motions with an Almanack for the Year of Our Lord 1741. Reprint: Gale Ecco (2010). . Also printed 1725 and 1731

1683 births
1748 deaths
18th-century British astronomers
People from South Kesteven District
English surveyors